Spring-forbi is a neighbourhood in Lyngby-Taarbæk Municipality, located north of Copenhagen. It is located north of Taarbæk and east of Jægersborg Dyrehave. The name is thought to originate from an inn located in Spring-forbi, the inn called Spring-ej-forbi (translation do not miss).

References 

Cities and towns in the Capital Region of Denmark
Copenhagen metropolitan area
Neighbourhoods in Denmark
Lyngby-Taarbæk Municipality